Rolando Marchelli (born 1664, date of death unknown) was an Italian painter of the Baroque period, active mainly in his natal city of Genoa.

References

1664 births
Year of death unknown
17th-century Italian painters
Italian male painters
Painters from Genoa
Italian Baroque painters